The Islamist uprising in Syria comprised a series of revolts and armed insurgencies by Sunni Islamists, mainly members of the Muslim Brotherhood, from 1976 until 1982. The uprising aimed to establish an Islamic Republic in Syria by overthrowing the Ba'athist government, in what has been called a "long campaign of terror". During the violent events, Islamists attacked both civilians and off-duty military personnel, and civilians were also killed in retaliatory strike by security forces. The uprising reached its climax in the 1982 Hama uprising.

Background

1963 Coup and 1964 Hama Riots 

In context, the Insurgency traces its origins to multiple factors. Historical ideological friction is a result of the Ba'ath Party's secularist foundation versus the Muslim Brotherhood's religious foundation. Muslim Brotherhood believed that Islamic religion had the central role in directing the laws of the state, while Ba'athism viewed religion as a private matter that should not influence state affairs.

This friction became heated following the 1963 Ba'ath Party coup which saw the Party claiming sole power in the country and subsequently outlawing all other organised opposition. In response, the Muslim Brotherhood encouraged general protests across the country. These protests were most acute in the city of Hama, long considered "a stronghold of landed conservatism". During the 1964 Hama uprising, Ba'ath Party responded violently, crushing the revolt with brutal force.  

Muslim Brotherhood was forced to continue its activities clandestinely. The ideological dispute began widening towards a sectarian one; as dominance of Alawite elites in the Ba'athist military, bureaucracy and politics became visible after the Old Guard was overthrown by the neo-Ba'athist military wing of Alawite General Salah Jadid in the 1966 coup.

1970 Coup and 1973 Constitutional Amendment 

On 13 November, Hafez Al Assad launched a coup which saw him gain sole power. To cement his power, on 31 January 1973, Assad implemented a new constitution which led to a national crisis. Unlike previous constitutions, this one did not require that the president of Syria must be a Muslim, leading to fierce demonstrations in Hama, Homs and Aleppo organized by the Muslim Brotherhood and the ulama. They labelled Assad as the "enemy of Allah" and called for a jihad against his rule. Under pressure, Assad returned the requirement and convinced imam Musa al-Sadr to issue a fatwa proclaiming the Alawite minority to be part of Shia Islam.

Robert D. Kaplan has compared Assad's coming to power to "an untouchable becoming maharajah in India or a Jew becoming tsar in Russia—an unprecedented development shocking to the Sunni majority population which had monopolized power for so many centuries."

Economic downturn 
According to historian Patrick Seale, the "economic boom following the October War had run out of steam, and new inequalities were created". Raphael Lefevre adds that the emergence of secular ideology had led to the "overturning of traditional structures of political and socioeconomic power". Additionally, a decrease in Gulf countries' economic support, the cost of Syria's military campaign in Lebanon, and the take-in of several refugees from the conflict all further exacerbated Syria's economic livelihood.

Economic impact of state socialism adopted by the Ba'athist government as well as rising assertiveness of Alawites in the new socio-political system resulted in the alienation of the traditional elites, landowners, industrialists and the bourgeoisie. Their support shifted in favour of the Islamic opposition which positioned itself as ideological defenders of private property and free trade.

Phases of the Insurgency

Phase One: Clandestine Terrorist Operations 1976–1979
1976 marked the Syrian army's intervention in the Lebanese civil war, initially against the Palestinian guerrillas (PLO). This was received with surprise across the Arab world and contributed to pre-existing reasons for discontent with the Syrian government. Historian Patrick Seale described this attack as "slaughtering Arabism's sacred cow".

In the same year, Syria experienced sporadic terror attacks, mostly explosions and assassinations. The killings were largely aimed at prominent government officials, including doctors and teachers. Most of the victims were Alawis, "which suggested that the assassins had targeted the community" but "no one could be sure who was behind" the killings. The Muslim Brotherhood was considered to be behind the violence.

The Iraqi government of Saddam Hussein had supported the insurgents with a steady flow of arms and supplies.

Phase Two: Large-scale Campaign June 1979 – January 1982

16 June 1979 marked the day of the Aleppo artillery school massacre. Member of school staff, Captain Ibrahim Yusuf, called cadets to an urgent meeting at the dining hall. Once assembled, gunmen fired indiscriminately at the cadets with automatic weapons and grenades. The massacre was masterminded by 'Adnan 'Uqla, a member of the Muslim Brotherhood who had formed a guerrilla group offshoot named the 'Fighting Vanguard' (Tal'ia Muqatila).

This massacre signalled a turn in the insurgency as it was now more than just a series of sporadic attacks, but a campaign of "large-scale urban warfare". By August, the Brotherhood had declared a jihad against the Syrian government, effectively claiming responsibility for the insurgency.

In the days leading up to 8 March 1980 (the 17th anniversary of the Ba'thist coup), nearly all Syrian cities were paralysed by strikes and protests, which sometimes developed into pitched battles with security forces. The events escalated into a widescale crackdown in Aleppo, where the government responded with overwhelming military force, sending in tens of thousands of troops, supported by tanks and helicopters. In and around Aleppo, hundreds of demonstrators were killed, and eight thousand were arrested. By April, the uprising in the area had been crushed.

Between 1979 and 1981, Brotherhood insurgents continued to target Ba'ath party officials, party offices, police stations, military vehicles, barracks, factories, and even Russian officials. Insurgents would form 'hit teams' to kill Ba'ath party members in their sleep, such as 'Abd al 'Aziz al 'Adi, who was murdered in front of his wife and children and had his body thrown into the street. On occasion, individuals who had denounced the killings were also targeted, including Sheikh al-Shami, Imam of the Suleymania mosque of Aleppo.

Other instances of terrorism include attacks in August, September and November of 1981, where the Brotherhood carried out three car-bomb attacks against government and military targets in Damascus, killing hundreds of people, according to the official press. Among the victims were Soviet officials, experts, and their families serving with the United Nations as part of the United Nations Disengagement Observer Force.

Phase Three: Government Response 1979-1981 
Losing control over the streets, the government decided on a policy of all-out-war on the terrorists after a Ba'ath party congress concluded in January 1980. The Party's first step was to arm Party loyalists and sympathizers, effectively creating a 'citizen militia'. By March and April, the cities of Jisr al-Shughur and Aleppo were brought into line with thousands of troops in garrison and tanks on the streets. Hundreds were rounded up in search-and-destroy operations.

In another case, in retaliation to a failed terror attack on an Alawite village near Hama, the army executed about 400 of Hama's inhabitants, chosen randomly among the male population of over the age of 14.

On 27 June 1980, Hafez Al Assad himself narrowly escaped death after a failed assassination attempt. The assailant fired a burst of rounds and threw two grenades, the first being kicked away by Assad and the second being covered by his personal bodyguard, Khalid al-Husayn, who died instantly. In retaliation, the very next day, Rifaat Al Assad's defence company flew into the infamous Palmyra prison in helicopters and killed hundreds of prisoners who had been Brotherhood-affiliates. By July 8, membership of the Muslim Brotherhood became a capital offence altogether, with a month-long grace period for those who wished to turn themselves in and avoid a death sentence. Some couple thousand individuals turned themselves in, hoping to escape the death penalty; mostly urban, educated, young men.

Phase Four: Crushing of the Insurgency 1982 

The insurgency is generally considered to have been crushed by the bloody Hama massacre of 1982, in which thousands of insurgents, soldiers and residents were killed, according to anti-Syrian Government claims "the vast majority innocent civilians". On 2 February 1982, the Brotherhood led a major insurrection in Hama, rapidly taking control of the city; the military responded by bombing Hama (whose population was about 250,000) throughout the rest of the month, killing between 2,000 and 25,000 people. The Hama events marked the defeat of the Brotherhood, and the militant Islamic movement in general, as a political force in Syria.

US Intelligence conducted an intelligence analysis with regards to possible outcomes of the conflict.

Aftermath
Having suppressed all opposition, Hafez al-Assad released some imprisoned members of the Brotherhood in the mid-1990s. 

The Muslim Brotherhood would have no physical presence in Syria again. 

Although its leadership is in exile, the Brotherhood continues to enjoy considerable sympathy among Syrians. Riyad al-Turk, a secular opposition leader, considers it "the most credible" Syrian opposition group.  The Brotherhood has continued to advocate a democratic political system; it has abandoned its calls for violent resistance and for the application of shari'a law, as well as for Sunni uprisings against Alawites.  Al-Turk and others in the secular opposition are inclined to take this evolution seriously, as a sign of the Brotherhood's greater political maturity, and believe that the Brotherhood would now be willing to participate in a democratic system of government.

In a January 2006 interview, the Brotherhood's leader, Ali Sadreddine Bayanouni, "said the Muslim Brotherhood wants a peaceful change of government in Damascus and the establishment of a 'civil, democratic state', not an Islamic republic." According to Bayanouni, the Syrian government admits having detained 30,000 people, giving a fair representation of the Brotherhood's strength.

List of assassinations during the uprising

Individuals assassinated between 1976–1979
the commander of the Hama garrison, Colonel Ali Haydar, killed in October 1976
the rector of Damascus University, Dr. Muhammad al-Fadl, killed in February 1977
the commander of the missile corps, Brigadier 'Abd al Hamid Ruzzug, killed in June 1977
the doyen of Syrian dentists, Dr Ibrahim Na'ama, killed in March 1978
the director of police affairs at the Ministry of the Interior, Colonel Ahmad Khalil, killed in August 1978
Public Prosecutor 'Adil Mini of the Supreme State Security Court, killed in April 1979.
President Hafez Asad's own doctor, the neurologist Dr. Muhammad Shahada Khalil, who was killed in August 1979.

Individuals assassinated between 1980–1982
Salim al-Lawzi, publisher of al-Hawadith, in Lebanon killed by Syrian assassins in March 1980.
Riad Taha, head of the journalists' union in Beirut killed in July 1980.
Banan al-Tantawi, wife of the former general director of Muslim Brothers Issam al-Attar, killed in Aachen in July 1980.
Salah al-Din Bitar, co-founder of the Ba'ath Party, killed in Paris on 21 July 1980.
While the involvement of the Syrian government "was not proved" in these killings, it "was widely suspected."

See also
Hama Massacre
History of the Muslim Brotherhood in Syria 
Human rights in Syria
List of modern conflicts in the Middle East
Syrian Civil War
Terrorism in Syria

References

External links

 
1979 protests
1980 protests
1981 protests
1982 protests
Islamism in Syria
Muslim Brotherhood
Political repression in Syria
Conflicts in 1976
Conflicts in 1977
Conflicts in 1978
Conflicts in 1979
Conflicts in 1980
Conflicts in 1981
Conflicts in 1982
20th century in Syria
1976 in Syria
1977 in Syria
1978 in Syria
1979 in Syria
1980 in Syria
1981 in Syria
1982 in Syria
20th-century rebellions
Islam in Syria
Politics of Syria
Persecution of Alawites
Shia–Sunni sectarian violence
Islamic terrorist incidents in the 20th century